Collonista rubricincta is a species of small sea snail with calcareous opercula, a marine gastropod mollusc in the family Colloniidae.

Description
The shell is minute with a shell size of 2.2 mm. It has a depressed-globose shape and is perforate. The spire is short. The apex is obtuse. There are four convex whorls, encircled by coarse white spiral ribs. The interstices are deep red. The base of the shell is smooth, with concentric red stripes. The large aperture  is rounded and oblique. The umbilicus is narrow. Some specimens are beaded below the sutures, and there is some variation in the width of the umbilical perforation. The revolving ribs are sometimes obsolete. There are usually eight ribs to double that number on the body whorl.

Distribution
This marine species occurs in the Indo-West Pacific

References

 Huang S.-I, Fu I-F. & Poppe G.T. (2016). Taiwanese and Philippine Colloniidae. Nomenclatural remarks and the description of 17 new species (Gastropoda: Colloniidae). Visaya. 4(5): 4-42.

External links
 To Biodiversity Heritage Library (3 publications)
 To ITIS
 To World Register of Marine Species
 

Colloniidae
Gastropods described in 1845